Truth? (stylized as TRUTH?) is the debut solo album by Japanese musician and composer Sugizo, released on November 19, 1997 by Cross. The drum'n'bass experimental album featured several guest musicians and peaked at the 12° position on Oricon charts.

Background and release 
In 1997, after reaching number one on Oricon for the first time with the fifth studio album Style, Luna Sea took a break and each member focused on their solo careers. Sugizo debuted his solo career on July 9 with the single "Lucifer". A remix version of it called "Replicant Lucifer" was released the following month. On September 10, he released "A Prayer" and like the previous single, a remix version called "Replicant Prayer" was released.

Truth? was released on CD and vinyl on November 19, 1997, with both singles being part of it, by the newly opened label by Sugizo himself, Cross. The album features several musicians, such as Ryuichi Sakamoto on piano, Mick Karn on bass and D-kiku. On December 21, as well as their singles, a remix version titled Replicant Truth? was released.

Celebrating his 20-year solo career, in addition to releasing Oneness M, Sugizo remastered and re-released Truth? on October 25, 2017. He also compiled the remixes "Replicant Lucifer", "Replicant Prayer" and Replicant Truth? on just one album, Replicants, released on the same day.

Chart performance 
"Lucifer" peaked at number eight on the Oricon Singles Chart staying for four weeks, while "A Prayer" peaked at seventh and stayed for five weeks. Truth? reached twelfth position and remained for three weeks on the Oricon Albums Chart.

Track listing 
All titles are stylized in capital letters, except "Le Fou" and "Femme Fatale".

Personnel 
 Sugizo - producer, composition

 Additional musicians
 Ryuichi Sakamoto - piano
 Mick Karn - bass guitar

References 

Japanese-language albums
Experimental music albums
1997 debut albums
Sugizo albums
CS1 Japanese-language sources (ja)